Denis Jesús Espinoza Camacho (born August 25, 1983) is a Nicaraguan footballer who currently plays as a goalkeeper for Deportivo Walter Ferretti.

Club career
Nicknamed el Pulpo (the Octopus), Espinoza started his career at hometown club San Marcos before moving to top club Diriangén. In 2008, he joined Walter Ferretti where he became the team captain.
He holds the record for the longest stretch (747 minutes) without allowing any goals in the primera division of Nicaragua, set during 2014 Apertura season.

International career
Espinoza made his debut for Nicaragua in an April 2004 friendly match against Bermuda and has, as of December 2013, earned a total of 33 caps, scoring 1 goal. He has represented his country in 6 FIFA World Cup qualification matches and played at the 2005, 2007, 2009, 2011 and 2013 UNCAF Nations Cups, as well as at the 2009 CONCACAF Gold Cup.

International goals

Personal life
Espinoza is married to Yira Meléndez and they have two children, Denis and Cristiana. They live in his hometown, San Marcos.

References

External links

1983 births
Living people
People from Carazo Department
Association football goalkeepers
Nicaraguan men's footballers
Nicaragua international footballers
2005 UNCAF Nations Cup players
2007 UNCAF Nations Cup players
2009 UNCAF Nations Cup players
2009 CONCACAF Gold Cup players
2011 Copa Centroamericana players
2013 Copa Centroamericana players
Diriangén FC players
C.D. Walter Ferretti players